Laurent Firode (born 11 March 1963) is a French film director and screenwriter.

Life
He did Chinese studies.

Filmography

References

External links
 

1963 births
French male screenwriters
French screenwriters
Film directors from Paris
Living people